The Odd Fellows Hall in La Grange, California was built in 1880.  Also known as the I.O.O.F. Building, it was listed on the National Register of Historic Places in 1979.  It served historically as a clubhouse and as a meeting hall.

It is described as a "good example of the vernacular Greek Revival style found in 1850s California" and "Significant also for its social function as the I.O.O.F. hall for the pioneer community."

It has a porch, likely added later in the century, decorated with jigsaw work.

It is a tall two-story wood building on a rubble stone foundation.  The slope of its roof, together with its front-facing gable with box cornice returns, gives the impression of a pediment;  this is one of its vernacular Greek Revival elements.  Other such elements are its narrow pilasters and its three bay front with a central doorway.  Its trim, which a photo shows is now painted blue, seems to have been originally painted green, contrasting with white for the building's clapboard siding, in a New England-style color scheme often used in California in the mid-1800s.

References

Clubhouses on the National Register of Historic Places in California
Cultural infrastructure completed in 1855
History of Stanislaus County, California
Greek Revival architecture in California
Odd Fellows buildings in California
Buildings and structures in Stanislaus County, California
National Register of Historic Places in Stanislaus County, California
1855 establishments in California